Riverstone (postcode: 2765) is a suburb of Blacktown, in the state of New South Wales, Australia. Originally settled in 1803 as part of a government stock farm, Riverstone is one of the oldest towns in Australia.

As at the 2016 census, Riverstone had an estimated population of 7,248.

History
Prior to settlement and colonisation of Australia, the area that was to become known as Riverstone was inhabited by the Darug tribe. Most of these people died due to introduced diseases following the arrival of the First Fleet, and the remainder were largely relocated to government farms and a series of settlements.

The Sydney Cove region originally settled in 1788 turned out to be unsuitable for farming, and after a number of years of near-famine in the colony, efforts were made to relocate food production inland to hopefully more climatically stable regions.  In 1803 a government stock farm was established in what was to become the Riverstone/Marsden Park area, on the basis of the abundant water supply and good grazing land there. In 1810 Lieut-Col Maurice Charles O'Connell was granted 2,500 acres (10 km2) of land in the district, which he named "Riverston Farm", after his birthplace in Ireland. (The "e" at the end first appeared on railway timetables in the 1860s, an apparent misprint that has become the accepted spelling, although in the Sydney region the name is still pronounced as though the "e" is not present).

Originally, beef cattle farmed in the area were driven overland to the Hawkesbury River for transport by sailing ship to the convict settlement at Sydney Cove. The construction of the Sydney to Richmond Railway line in 1864 both eliminated the need for this and opened up the region to non-rural development. 
An important meatworks was established there in 1878, undergoing various stages of rebuilding and expansion until it closed permanently in 1992.

In 1970, a major fire at the Riverstone Meatworks killed six men, who were attempting to lead the animals to safety.

In 1988, as part of a Federal Government programme to commemorate the 200th anniversary of European settlement in Australia, a heritage museum was established in the old Masonic hall.

In Riverstone, there has also been a flood.

The suburb boundaries of Riverstone were changed in November 2020, shrinking the size of the suburb and creating the new suburbs of Grantham Farm in the east and Richards and Angus in the west. The suburb also no longer extended into the Hawkesbury local government area, with those areas absorbed into the suburb of Vineyard.

Heritage listings 
Riverstone has a number of heritage-listed sites, including:
 Riverstone railway station
 Station residence

Developments

In the 1880s O'Connell's widow subdivided and sold off most of the original grant, and a pattern of intersecting streets was laid out, mostly named after famous streets in London (e.g. Piccadilly Street, Gladstone Parade etc.). A substantial railway station, churches and other infrastructure were also constructed. The presumption was that Riverstone was set to become an important regional centre but this did not actually happen.

Most of the allotments were eventually taken up for suburban housing but a few of the original 1880s blocks remain vacant to the present day. Riverstone terrace, erected in 1883, is a curious relic of the anticipated 19th century population boom. It was meant to be the first of a row of high-density terrace housing units that would run the length of Garfield road. However this single block and the small unit next to it were the only ones ever built. For many years the sight of a high density inner-city housing block situated in an empty country paddock remained a bizarre local landmark.

Riverstone remained a small country town until the beginning of the 21st century when the current housing boom swallowed it up as part of the urban sprawl. Large areas of former farmland have recently (2014) also been released for housing in Riverstone and surrounding suburbs.  On its northern side Riverstone still has a large and thriving industrial area. Poultry farming and intensive market gardening are also still important activities in the area.

Population
According to the 2016 census of Population, there were 7,247 people in Riverstone.
 Aboriginal and Torres Strait Islander people made up 4.5% of the population. 
 74.3% of people were born in Australia. The next most common countries of birth were India 2.0%, Philippines 1.8%, England 1.8% and New Zealand 1.4%.
 78.2% of people spoke only English at home. Other languages spoken at home included Maltese at 1.5%. 
 The most common responses for religion were Catholic 29.5%, No Religion 20.7% and Anglican 18.7%.

Schools
Riverstone features two public schools: Riverstone High School and Riverstone Public School. It also has three private schools: St Johns Catholic Primary School (Est 1882), Norwest Christian College (1980) (formerly known as Coverdale Christian School) and Australian Christian College. ACC has two components: the on campus day school and the distance education school, which serves home educated students across New South Wales.

Churches
Riverstone Baptist Church - corner McCulloch and Regent Streets
 Riverstone Community Church - corner Garfield Road East and Hamilton Street
 Riverstone Anglican Church (St Pauls) - 19 Elizabeth Street
 Riverstone Uniting Church - corner Oxford Street and Garfield Road East
 St Johns Catholic Church - corner Garfield Road East and McCulloch Street
 Voice of Victory Church - Sam Lane Centre, Park Street
 Free Presbyterian - corner Oxford and Regent Streets

Transport

Riverstone is situated between the Richmond Road running from Blacktown to Richmond, and the Windsor Road running from Windsor to North Parramatta.

Riverstone railway station is on the Richmond branch of the North Shore & Western Line on the Sydney Trains network, between Blacktown and Richmond. From dawn to about 9pm, commuter trains to Sydney leave at approximately 30-minute intervals, in most cases coinciding with the arrival of a train from Sydney. They stay for two minutes because the next station, Vineyard, is single platform. After that they shift to an hourly schedule. Depending on the hour, train services running through Riverstone offer a varying number of "limited stops" to the Sydney CBD and the majority then continue over the Sydney Harbour Bridge to the North Shore line and Hornsby or Berowra. Apart from the city stations, transfer to most other lines is easily made at Strathfield, Redfern or Parramatta, and other stops that offer fewer choices. The peak-hour journey from Riverstone to Central takes a little over an hour, and another 20 minutes to the popular destination of Chatswood. Buses at Riverstone are run by Busways with route 757 that goes to Mount Druitt and 747 to Marsden Park and Rouse Hill.

Developments at the Garfield Rd traffic lights adjacent to the Railway Station have caused massive traffic disruptions.

Riverstone is one of the few suburbs left in the Sydney region with a level crossing with old-fashioned boom gates. This view looking west onto the undeveloped flood-prone paddocks is popular with Sydney film and TV commercial makers as a stand-in for a small country railway station. The final parting scene in the film Beneath Clouds was shot there.

The M7 Motorway can be accessed by the Richmond Road ramp to provide faster access from Riverstone to the city. Riverstone and surrounding suburbs have a continuous motorway link to Sydney Airport via the Lane Cove Tunnel.

Tallawong Metro Station is located just 10 minutes by car from Riverstone's CBD.

National Broadband Network (NBN) 
Riverstone was named as one of the second release sites in the rollout of the optical fibre National Broadband Network. As of March 2014 most of the Riverstone residential streets were fitted with the NBN cable.

References

External links 

 Riverstone & District Historical Society
 Joseph Henry Cragg's Riverstone 1880-1920
 Revised suburb boundary of Riverstone (November 2020) - Blacktown City Council

Suburbs of Sydney
City of Blacktown